Christian Nielsen may refer to:

 Christian Nielsen (rower) (born 1988), Danish rower
 Christian Nielsen (Danish sailor) (1873–1952), Danish sailor
 Christian Nielsen (Belgian sailor) (born 1932), Belgian sailor
 Christian Nielsen (footballer) (born 1985), Danish football player
 Christian Nielsen (football manager) (born 1974), Danish football manager
 Christian Overgaard Nielsen (1918–1999), Danish zoologist and ecologist
 Christian Frühstück Nielsen (1878–1956), Danish architect
 Christian Charles Nielsen (born 1975), American spree killer